Sparreholm Castle is a manor house in Flen Municipality, Södermanland County, Sweden. The estate is located on Lake Båven just outside the community of Sparreholm in Hyltinge parish.

History
The main house received its current appearance in the 1890s according to drawings by architect  Johan August Westerberg  (1836-1900). At the manor there is a conference facilities and a café. Sparreholm automobile museum is located in a separate hall building east of the manor. South of the manor in the former carriage house is a  large collections of jukeboxes. In the ground floor of the building is the bicycle museum.

See also
List of castles in Sweden

References

External links
Sparreholms slott, museer & hästcenter website
 Buildings and structures in Södermanland County